Didesmethylcitalopram is an active metabolite of the antidepressant drug citalopram (racemic). Didesmethylescitalopram is an active metabolite of the antidepressant escitalopram, the S-enantiomer of citalopram. Like citalopram and escitalopram, didesmethyl(es)citalopram functions as a selective serotonin reuptake inhibitor (SSRI), and is responsible for some of its parents' therapeutic benefits.

See also 

 Desmethylcitalopram
 Desmethylsertraline
 Desmethylvenlafaxine
 Norfluoxetine

References 

Isobenzofurans
Nitriles
Fluoroarenes
Human drug metabolites